Analogue Bubblebath 3.1 is the eighth EP released by artist Richard D. James, under his commonly known alias, AFX. It is a companion to Analogue Bubblebath Vol 3.

The EP consists of five untitled tracks. It was released in 1997 on Rephlex Records in the 12" vinyl format. No official CD release exists.

The first four tracks were originally released on CD copies of Analogue Bubblebath Vol 3 as tracks 9, 13 and 8 respectively. The first track on side B is the sound of a bathtub draining, which was added to the very end of the CD copy of Analogue Bubblebath Vol 3.

The final track on side B contains no music. It's a lighthearted discussion about excrement and genitalia. In between the last two tracks is a locked groove that forces the listener to manually place the needle at the beginning of the final track to be able to hear it.

Track listing
All songs written and composed by Richard D. James.

Side one
 Untitled – 5:06
 Untitled – 5:05

Side two
 Untitled – 0:09
 Untitled – 4:05
 Untitled – 2:26

External links
 More info, artwork and samples here
 Complete AFX discography

1997 EPs
Aphex Twin EPs
Rephlex Records EPs